Alua Balkibekova (born 24 November 1996) is a Kazakh boxer. She participated at the 2014 AIBA Youth World Boxing Championships, being awarded the bronze medal in the women's flyweight event. In the same year, Balkibekova participated at the 2014 Summer Youth Olympics in the boxing competition, winning no medal. She also participated at the 2019 AIBA Women's World Boxing Championships in the light flyweight event, winning no medal. Balkibekova then participated at the 2022 IBA Women's World Boxing Championships, being awarded the silver medal in the minimumweight event. In the final match, she was defeated by Ayşe Çağırır.

References

External links 

1996 births
Living people
Place of birth missing (living people)
Kazakhstani women boxers
Flyweight boxers
Light-flyweight boxers
Mini-flyweight boxers
Boxers at the 2014 Summer Youth Olympics
AIBA Women's World Boxing Championships medalists
21st-century Kazakhstani women